Ardent Studios is an American recording studio located in Memphis, Tennessee, United States.

History 

Ardent Studios was founded by John Fry and were initially a studio in his family's garage, where he recorded his first 45s for the Ardent Records label. Equipment in the studio included an Altec tube mixing console, Ampex 2-track tape recorder, Pultec equalizer, and Neumann microphones. In 1966 the studios moved to a commercial location at 1457 National Street, which was shared with a bookshop. Tom Dowd was consulting with Auditronics on an early multitrack console for nearby Stax Records, and Fry ordered the same input modules for his second mixing board. When the studio upgraded to a Scully 4-track tape recorder, Ardent became the first 4-track studio in Memphis. It was also the first studio in the area to use EMT plate reverbs.

Ardent became home to young producers and engineers such as Jim Dickinson, Terry Manning, Joe Hardy, John Hampton, Paul Ebersold, and later Skidd Mills, Jeff Powell, Brad Blackwood, Pete Mathews, and Jason Latshaw. In 1971, Ardent Studios moved to its present location on Madison Avenue, upgrading its equipment with 24-track tape recorders, larger mixing consoles, and more gear.

Ardent came to have three studios equipped, all with large format Neve and SSL desks alongside Pro Tools rigs. It is managed by Jody Stephens (also the drummer for Big Star, an early Ardent group whose first two albums appeared on the Ardent Records label in the early 1970s). All three Big Star albums were named in Rolling Stone's 500 Greatest Albums of All Time, and “In The Street,” from their first album, became the theme for “That 70s Show.”

In its early years, Ardent Studio recorded Sam & Dave, Led Zeppelin, Isaac Hayes, Leon Russell, and the Staples Singers, and in the 1970s, 1980s, and 1990s recorded James Taylor, ZZ Top, R.E.M., George Thorogood, The Allman Brothers, Bob Dylan, Joe Walsh, and Jimmie and Stevie Ray Vaughan. In the 2000s younger artists such as The White Stripes, 3 Doors Down, Cat Power, North Mississippi Allstars, The Raconteurs, Low Cut Connie, and Guy Sebastian recorded at Ardent, and the soundtracks for Hustle and Flow and Black Snake Moan were produced at Ardent as well. Ardent has recorded over 70 gold and platinum albums and singles.[which?]

Gallery

Notable artists 

 .38 Special
 3 Doors Down
 8Ball & MJG
 Aaron Tippin
 Against Me!
 Al Green
 Alain Bashung
 Albert Collins
 Alex Chilton
 ALL
 Alvin Youngblood Hart
 Anita Ward
 Anthony Gomes
 Archers of Loaf
 Audio Adrenaline
 Bar-Kays
 B.B. King
 Big Star
 Big Tent Revival
 Black Oak Arkansas
 Black Rob
 Bobby Rush
 Bob Dylan
 Booker T & the MG's
 Cat Power
 Cheap Trick
 Coco Montoya
 Cracker
 Dave Matthews
 DC Talk
 DeGarmo and Key
 Dreams So Real
 Evanescence
 Fuel
 George Ducas
 George Thorogood
 Gin Blossoms
 Golden Smog
 Guy Sebastian
 Isaac Hayes
 James Taylor
 Jimmie Vaughan
 Joe Walsh
 John Hiatt
 Julien Baker
 Juvenile
 Led Zeppelin
 Leon Russell
 Little Texas
 Lucero
 Lynyrd Skynyrd
 Mach Five
 Maria Taylor
 Marty Brown
 Marty Stuart
 M.I.A.
 Mika Nakashima
 Mikey Jukebox
 Mojo Nixon
 Montgomery Gentry
 Mudhoney
 North Mississippi Allstars
 Prehab
 Primal Scream
 Prix
 Puscifer
 R.E.M.
 Reverend Horton Heat
 Robert Cray
 Satellite Soul
 Screamin' Cheetah Wheelies
 Seven Mary Three
 Shawn Camp
 Sister Hazel
 Skillet
 Smalltown Poets
 Soundgarden
 Spacehog
 Steve Earle
 Stevie Ray Vaughan
 Tanya Tucker
 The Afghan Whigs
 The Allman Brothers
 The Angels
 The Box Tops
 The Cramps
 The Fabulous Thunderbirds
 The Georgia Satellites
 The Hooters
 The Posies
 The Raconteurs
 The Radiators
 The Replacements
 The Scruffs
 The Smashing Pumpkins
 The Tragically Hip
 The White Stripes
 Tim McCarver
 Todd Agnew
 Todd Snider
 Tom Cochrane
 Tommy Hoehn
 Toots Hibbert
 Travis Tritt
 Triple 6 Mafia
 Waylon Jennings
 Yo Gotti
 Zucchero
 ZZ Top

Notable albums 

 Al Green – Soul Survivor
 Alain Bashung – Osez Joséphine
 Alex Chilton – Like Flies on Sherbert
 Alvin Youngblood Hart – Motivational Speaker
 B.B. King – Blues Summit
 Big Star – Keep an Eye on the Sky, #1 Record, Radio City, Third/Sister Lovers
 Booker T. & the M.G.'s – Soul Limbo
 George Thorogood and the Destroyers – The Dirty Dozen, Bad to the Bone, Born to be Bad
 Guy Sebastian – The Memphis Album
 Huey Lewis and the News – Soulsville
 James Taylor – Mud Slide Slim and the Blue Horizon
 Jim Dickinson – Free Beer Tomorrow, Dixie Fried
 Joe Walsh – Got Any Gum?
 Johnny Diesel and the Injectors – Johnny Diesel and the Injectors 
 Led Zeppelin – Led Zeppelin III (Mixing Only)
 North Mississippi Allstars – Electric Blue Watermelon, 51 Phantom, Polaris, Shake Hands With Shorty
 R.E.M. – Green
 Stevie Ray Vaughan – Live at Carnegie Hall, The Sky is Crying
 The Afghan Whigs – Gentlemen
 The Allman Brothers – Shades of Two Worlds
 The Angels – Beyond Salvation
 The Box Tops – Cry Like a Baby
 The Raconteurs – Broken Boy Soldiers
 The Replacements – Pleased to Meet Me
 The Scruffs – Wanna Meet the Scruffs?
 The Staple Singers – The Staple Swingers
 The White Stripes – Get Behind Me Satan
 ZZ Top – Antenna, Afterburner, Eliminator, El Loco, Degüello, The Best of ZZ Top, Tejas, Fandango!, Tres Hombres, Rio Grande Mud

References

External links
 Official website

Recording studios in Tennessee